Xenophyllum acerosum is a species of flowering plant in the family Asteraceae. It is found only in Ecuador. Its natural habitat is subtropical or tropical dry shrubland. It is threatened by habitat loss.

References

acerosum
Flora of Ecuador
Endangered plants
Taxonomy articles created by Polbot